Scillato (Sicilian: Scillatu) is a comune (municipality) in the Metropolitan City of Palermo in the Italian region Sicily, located about  southeast of Palermo.

Scillato borders the following municipalities: Caltavuturo, Cerda, Collesano, Isnello, Polizzi Generosa, Sclafani Bagni.

Demographic evolution

References

Municipalities of the Metropolitan City of Palermo